Hank Locklin Sings Hank Williams is a studio album by American country singer–songwriter Hank Locklin. It was released in September 1964 via RCA Victor Records. The record was co-produced by Chet Atkins and Bob Ferguson. The project was a tribute effort to Locklin's friend and fellow country artist Hank Williams. It was recorded with in an orchestral style that embodied Locklin's new Nashville Sound musical identity. It received mixed reviews from writers and critics.

Background and content
Hank Locklin recorded among country music's first concept albums (albums centered around a particular theme), beginning with Foreign Love in 1958. He followed with several more studio releases that focused on concepts, including a handful of tribute LP's to artists Locklin considered inspirations to his own career. This began with 1962's tribute album to Roy Acuff. As the 1960s progressed, Locklin's musical production featured more orchestral arrangements. This orchestral sound was also embedded into Hank Locklin Sings Hank Williams.

The project featured The Nashville A-Team session musicians, which included a handful of string instruments. The album was recorded in July 1964 at the RCA Victor Studio, located in Nashville, Tennessee. It was produced by Chet Atkins, who produced Locklin's previous studio releases for RCA. Bob Ferguson is also given co-production credit. Hank Locklin Sings Hank Williams consisted of twelve tracks, all of which had been first recorded by Hank Williams. Locklin chose to record the album as a tribute to Williams, who was a friend of his. In his earliest years of performing, Locklin sang alongside Williams in small clubs and dance halls often singing the songs featured on the album. Songs Locklin recorded for the project included "I'm So Lonesome I Could Cry," "Your Cheatin' Heart" and "Hey, Good Lookin'."

Release and reception

Hank Locklin Sings Hank Williams was released in September 1964 on RCA Victor Records. It was Locklin's ninth studio record in his music career. The album was distributed as a vinyl LP and contained six songs on either side of the record. In later years, the album would be issued in digital formats as a music download and for streaming services. No known singles were spawned from the album, unlike many of Locklin's studio releases. The album would receive a nomination from the Grammy Awards in 1964 for Best Country and Western Vocal Performance.

Following its release, Hank Locklin Sings Hank Williams was reviewed by Billboard magazine in December 1964. Critics gave the album a warm response, calling it "a winner for dealers and stations." Meanwhile, Greg Adams of Allmusic only gave the album 2.5 out of 5 stars. Although he considered to be a "respectable update" of Williams' catalog, he also found the record to be a "countrypolitan affair" (in reference to the album's string instrumentation). Adams commented that Locklin's is not that of a crooner like Eddy Arnold and Jim Reeves and therefore, pop instrumentation should be avoided.

Track listing
All songs are composed by Hank Williams, except where noted.

Vinyl version

Digital version

Personnel
All credits are adapted from the liner notes of Hank Locklin Sings Hank Williams.

Musical personnel
 Brenton Banks – strings
 George Binkley – strings
 Cecil Brower – strings
 Kenneth Buttrey – drums
 Pete Drake – steel guitar
 Ray Edenton – rhythm guitar
 Lillian Hunt – strings
 The Jordanaires – background vocals
 The Anita Kerr Singers – background vocals
 Hank Locklin – lead vocals
 Grady Martin – guitar
 Wayne Moss – guitar
 Hargus "Pig" Robbins – piano
 Booker Rowe – strings

Technical personnel
 Chet Atkins – producer
 Bob Ferguson – liner notes, producer
 Bill Vandevort – engineer

Release history

References

1964 albums
Albums produced by Chet Atkins
Albums produced by Bob Ferguson (music)
Hank Locklin albums
Hank Williams tribute albums
RCA Victor albums
Tribute albums